The World Tourism Organization (UNWTO) is a specialized agency of the United Nations mandated with the promotion of responsible, sustainable and universally accessible tourism. It is headquartered in Madrid, Spain.

UNWTO is the leading international organization for the promotion of tourism as a driver of economic growth, inclusive development and environmental sustainability. It provides leadership and support in advancing knowledge and tourism policies and serves as a global forum for tourism policy and a source of tourism research and knowledge. It encourages the implementation of the Global Code of Ethics for Tourism e Development, Competitiveness, Innovation & Digital Transformation, Ethics, Culture & Social Responsibility, Technical Cooperation, UNWTO Academy, and Statistics.

The official languages of UNWTO are Arabic, Chinese, English, French, Russian and Spanish.

Before the outbreak of the COVID-19 pandemic, tourism stood at an all-time high: 1 out of 10 jobs worldwide depended on tourism and international tourist arrivals reached 1.5 billion in 2019. Against a backdrop of heightened uncertainty, UNWTO conveyed the Global Tourism Crisis Committee to guide the tourism sector as it faced up to the COVID-19 challenge.

Members 
The UNWTO has 160 member states, six associate members (Flemish Community (1997), Puerto Rico (2002), Aruba (1987), Hong Kong (1999), Macau (1981), Madeira (1995)), and two permanent observers (Holy See (1979), Palestine (1999)). 

Nonmembers are: Australia, Belgium, Belize, Canada, Denmark, Dominica, Estonia, Finland, Grenada, Guyana, Iceland, Ireland, Kiribati, Latvia, Liechtenstein, Luxembourg, the Marshall Islands, Micronesia, Nauru, New Zealand, Saint Kitts and Nevis, Saint Lucia, Saint Vincent and the Grenadines, Singapore, Solomon Islands, Somalia, South Sudan, Suriname, Sweden, Tonga, Tuvalu, the United Kingdom and the United States. Seventeen state members have withdrawn from the organization for different periods in the past including Australia (citing poor value for money), Bahamas, Bahrain, Belgium, Canada (Canada withdrew from the World Tourism Organization when it appointed Robert Mugabe as a leader in 2013), Costa Rica, El Salvador, Grenada, Honduras, Kuwait, Latvia, Malaysia, Myanmar, Panama, Philippines, Qatar, Thailand, United Kingdom and Puerto Rico (as an associate member). The Netherlands Antilles was an associate member before its dissolution.

The United Arab Emirates (UAE) rejoined the organization in May 2013, 26 years after having left UNWTO.

Additionally, and uniquely for a United Nations specialized agency, UNWTO has over 500 affiliate members, representing the private sector, educational institutions, tourism associations and local tourism authorities, non-governmental entities with specialised interests in tourism, and commercial and non-commercial bodies and associations with activities related to the aims of UNWTO or falling within its competence.

On April 2, 2022, Russia announced it would leave the UNWTO, and the organization subsequently voted the same day to suspend Russia in response to the Russian invasion of Ukraine.

Secretaries-General

Structure

General Assembly
The General Assembly is the principal gathering of the World Tourism Organization. It meets every two years to approve the budget and programme of work and to debate topics of vital importance to the tourism sector. Every four years it elects a Secretary-General. The General Assembly is composed of full members and associate members. Affiliate members and representatives of other international organizations participate as observers. The World Committee on Tourism Ethics is a subsidiary organ of the General Assembly.

Executive Council
The Executive Council is UNWTO's governing board, responsible for ensuring that the Organization carries out its work and adheres to its budget. It meets at least twice a year and is composed of members elected by the General Assembly in a ratio of one for every five full members. As host country of UNWTO's headquarters, Spain has a permanent seat on the Executive Council. Representatives of the associate members and affiliate members participate in Executive Council meetings as observers.

Committees
Specialized committees of UNWTO members advise on management and programme content. These include: the Programme Committee, the Committee on Budget and Finance, the Committee on Statistics and the Tourism Satellite Account, the Committee on Market and Competitiveness, the Sustainable Development of Tourism Committee, the World Committee on Tourism Ethics, the Committee on Poverty Reduction and the Committee for the Review of applications for affiliate membership.

Secretariat
The Secretariat is responsible for implementing UNWTO's programme of work and serving the needs of members and affiliate members. The group is led by Secretary-General, Zurab Pololikashvili of Georgia, who supervises about 110 full-time staff at UNWTO's Madrid headquarters. The Secretariat also includes a regional support office for Asia-Pacific in Osaka, Japan, financed by the Japanese Government, and a liaison office in Geneva as UNWTO's representation to the UN System, the World Trade Organization, and other diplomatic organizations in Switzerland.

Official languages
The official languages of UNWTO are Arabic, Chinese, English, French, Russian and Spanish.

Publications

 UNWTO Annual Report
 UNWTO Declarations
 UNWTO Fact Sheets
 UNWTO World Tourism Barometer
 Knowledge Network Issues Paper Series

Visa Openness Report

UNWTO research concluded that, by improving visa processes and entry formalities, G20 economies could boost their international tourist numbers by 122 million, tourism exports by US$2016 billion and employment by 5 million.

The Organization's latest UNWTO Visa Openness Report, published in 2016, shows the highest ever percentage of international tourists not requiring a visa to travel - 39% compared with 23% in 2008. The report concluded that the 30 countries whose citizens were least affected by visa restrictions in 2015 were (based on the data compiled by the UNWTO, based on information from national official institutions):

See also
World Tourism Day

References

Further reading
Jafari, J. (1974). Creation of the intergovernmental world tourism organization. Annals of Tourism Research, 2, (5), 237–245.
United Nations General Assembly. (1969). General assembly – twenty fourth session.
United Nations World Tourism Organization. (2007). About UNWTO.
World Tourism Organization. (2003). WTO news, 2003 (3). Madrid: World Tourism Organization.

External links

 
 UNWTO eLibrary
 UNWTO Themis Foundation

 
Tourism agencies
United Nations Development Group
United Nations specialized agencies
Organisations based in Madrid
Spain and the United Nations
International organisations based in the Community of Madrid
Organizations established in 1974